Charkhestaneh may refer to:
 Charkhestaneh, Azna, Iran
 Charkhestaneh, Dowreh, Iran
 Charkhestaneh, Khorramabad, Iran